Martino Denti de' Cipriani, B. (died 1655) was a Roman Catholic prelate, who served as Bishop of Strongoli (1652–1655).

Biography
Martino Denti de' Cipriani was ordained a priest in the Clerics Regular of Saint Paul.
On 26 August 1652, he was appointed during the papacy of Pope Innocent X as Bishop of Strongoli. 
On 29 September 1652, he was consecrated bishop by Marcantonio Franciotti, Cardinal-Priest of Santa Maria della Pace, with Giovan Battista Foppa, Archbishop of Benevento, and Ranuccio Scotti Douglas, Bishop Emeritus of Borgo San Donnino, serving as co-consecrators. 
He served as Bishop of Strongoli until his death in 1655.

References

External links and additional sources
 (for Chronology of Bishops) 
 (for Chronology of Bishops) 

17th-century Italian Roman Catholic bishops
1655 deaths
Bishops appointed by Pope Innocent X
Barnabite bishops